Ahmed Adam Salah (born 10 January 1966) is a Sudanese long-distance runner. He competed in the men's marathon at the 1996 Summer Olympics.

References

1966 births
Living people
Athletes (track and field) at the 1996 Summer Olympics
Sudanese male long-distance runners
Sudanese male marathon runners
Olympic athletes of Sudan
Place of birth missing (living people)